eBags is an online retailer of handbags, luggage, backpacks, laptop bags, and travel accessories that was founded in Greenwood Village, Colorado near Denver. 

Before being acquired for $105 million by Samsonite in 2017, the main website, eBags.com, carried bags and accessories from more than 650 brands. eBags also operated the eBags Corporate Sales site and offered its own private label products under the name The eBags Brand. 

During 2020, eBags stopped selling brands not owned by Samsonite. As of September 2020, eBags.com retailed products from 5 brands: eBags private label brand, Samsonite, American Tourister, Hartmann, and High Sierra.

History 

Jon Nordmark, Peter Cobb, Frank Steed, Andy Youngs, and Eliot Cobb founded eBags in the late spring of 1998.

The website eBags.com launched on March 1, 1999 with seven brands including Samsonite, JanSport, and Skyway luggage. The focus was primarily on luggage due to the backgrounds of the founders, four of whom worked previously at Samsonite.

As eBags matured, it launched a corporate sales division, retail websites globally for partners (Tumi and Case Logic), a footwear-handbag website (6PM.com) and eBags' Europe.

2002: Global Technology Services (GTS) 

In 2002, Tumi, the luxury luggage manufacturer, asked eBags to operate Tumi.com. In response, eBags formed Global Technology Services (GTS) and operated Tumi.com starting in 2002, followed by Tumi UK in October 2005, Tumi Germany in July 2006, and Tumi Japan in August 2006. eBags started operating retail sites for Case Logic in the United States and the U.K. in July 2005.

2004: 6PM.com 
eBags purchased as Shoedini.com in March 2004 and renamed it to 6PM.com in November 2005. 6PM's main feature was matching bags with shoes. 6PM was sold in October 2007 to Zappos.

2004: eBags Europe 
In October 2004, eBags launched eBags.co.uk with the intent of expanding further into Europe. The eBags UK offices were located in Cambridge, England. That year marked eBags' expansion of its brand representation to more than 600 total in the United States and Europe. eBags.co.uk was later closed in December 2008 and the company focus returned to growing the main site, eBags.com.

2016: eBags 
Before being acquired by Samsonite, eBags.com carried 67,000 bags and travel accessories from 600 brands. As of February 2016, eBags sold over 25 million bags and had over 3.2 million reviews on the website.

2017: Samsonite Acquired eBags 
In April 2017, Samsonite agreed to acquire eBags for $105 million in cash. eBags generated $158.5 million in sales in 2016, up 23.5% from $128.3 million in 2015. 

eBags headquarters in Greenwood Village, Colorado was closed in September 2020 and moved to Massachusetts.

References

External links
 eBags.com

Companies based in Greenwood Village, Colorado
Retail companies established in 1998
Internet properties established in 1998
Samsonite
Online retailers of the United Kingdom
Online retailers of the United States